Heerak Jyoti Mahanta, also spelled as Hirakjyoti Mahanta, Hirak Jyoti Mahanta, alias Jayanta Medhi alias Naren Deka (Real name: Heerak Jyoti Mahanta)  was the first Deputy Commander-in-chief of the United Liberation Front of Asom (ULFA). He was killed on the eve of 31 December 1991.

He was said to be one of the hardcore cadres of the outfit. He strongly opposed any kind of surrendering and lateral talk with the Indian government and it never happened within the outfit till his death. After his death, a large section of second-rung leaders and members surrendered to government authorities in 1992.

Early life and education
Heerak Jyoti Mahanta was a student of Guwahati's renowned Cotton Collegiate and passed Bachelor of Science in physics under Gauhati University.

Militancy life
Heerak Jyoti Mahanta completed his militancy training in Kachin with ULFA Chief Paresh Baruah and they returned to Assam in 1984. Trained in Kachin, Myanmar, Mahanta was a brave and strong youth militant leader in the outfit.

The conspiracy
In the late 1990s, Mahanta became very powerful. He openly criticized the policies of the central leadership of ULFA and posed a potential threat to Paresh Baruah, the commander-in-chief of the outfit. Subsequently, under the direction of Paresh Baruah, his movement was passed on to the Assam Police, which led to his death in a serene hillock.

Death 
On 31 December 1991, military intelligence received a tip-off about Heerak Jyoti Mahanta's hideout in Guwahati city. A huge team of the army made a quick operation and nabbed Mahanta's one of the security guards Moon Ali from a hotel in Fancy Bazaar of the city. Moon Ali's detention led the army to the house of Nripen Baruah in the Geetanagar area, where Heerak and his two other security guards were taking shelter. The army encircled the house as Heerak was the real target. Heerak was unable to escape from the army's gherao and all three were detained by the army.

Heerak was taken to Geetanagar police station, where he was shot dead.
Most of the newspapers, however, argue that uncompromising Mahanta was killed by Army as he refused to relent even after being caught.

Heerak Jyoti Mahanta's killing created a massive outrage throughout the state amongst the outfit and civilians and thousands of villagers of his native place of Nalbari district gathered where ULFA militants offered the last honor to their leader. There were funeral processions following the killing of Heerak Jyoti Mahanta, which was a law and order challenge to the state government.

See also
List of top leaders of ULFA
Sanjukta Mukti Fouj

References

ULFA members
1991 deaths
Assamese nationalism
Insurgency in Northeast India
People from Assam
1961 births
Gauhati University alumni
Nalbari district
People from Nalbari district